Easy Come, Easy Go is an EP by American singer Elvis Presley, containing songs from the motion picture of the same name, released by RCA Victor on March 1, 1967.

Recording and release history 
Recording sessions took place on September 28 and 29, 1966, at Paramount Studio in Hollywood, California. After the relative freedom of the Nashville sessions in May that yielded How Great Thou Art and other songs more to his taste, Presley was reportedly unhappy with the quality of the songs selected for the film, allegedly referring to the selections as "shit" during the recording session. It is often reported that Presley recorded "Leave My Woman Alone" for the film, but only an instrumental backing was ever recorded; Presley never recorded a vocal for the song. Seven selections were recorded for the film; the song "She's a Machine" was not used in the movie, but would be released on Elvis Sings Flaming Star the following year.

The remaining six appeared on an extended play single released to coincide with the March 1967 premiere of the film. It failed to chart on the Billboard Hot 100, and sold fewer than 30,000 units total. Given that the EP format was no longer a viable marketing medium, and the poor performance of Easy Come, Easy Go, it was the final release of new material by Presley in the EP format. The British issue, however, did top the UK EP charts despite featuring only four of the six tracks on the US edition ("The Love Machine" and "You Gotta Stop" were omitted).

In the film, Presley sings "Yoga is as Yoga Does" in duet with Elsa Lanchester. As was commonplace with Presley soundtrack releases, the version on the EP is a solo vocal.

Track listing

Personnel

 Elvis Presley – vocals
 The Jordanaires – background vocals
 Anthony Terran – trumpet
 Mike Henderson – trumpet
 Butch Parker – trombone
 Meredith Flory – saxophone
William Hood – saxophone
 Scotty Moore – lead guitar
 Tiny Timbrell – rhythm guitar
 Charlie McCoy – acoustic guitar, organ, harmonica
 Michael Rubini – harpsichord
 Bob Moore  – double bass
 D.J. Fontana – drums
 Buddy Harman  – drums
 Hal Blaine  – drums
 Emil Radocchia – percussion
Curry Tjader – percussion
Larry Bunker – percussion

References

External links

1967 soundtrack albums
RCA Records soundtracks
Elvis Presley soundtracks
1967 EPs
Elvis Presley EPs
RCA Records EPs
Musical film soundtracks
Comedy film soundtracks